Blondie Johnson is a 1933 American pre-Code gangster film directed by Ray Enright and starring Joan Blondell and Chester Morris. It was produced by Warner Bros.

Plot
Set during the Great Depression, Blondie Johnson (Joan Blondell) quits her job after her boss sexually harasses her. She and her sick mother are then evicted from their apartment and are unable to get any government relief funds. After her mother dies, Blondie is determined to become rich. She soon gets involved in a criminal organization and falls in love with Danny, one of its members (Chester Morris). Later she convinces him to take down his boss. Blondie eventually climbs up the criminal ladder, becoming boss to the "little navy" gang before the gang is exposed. Blondie is convicted and sent to prison for six years, but she and Danny promise each other that they will make a fresh start after paying their debts to society.

Cast
 Joan Blondell as Blondie Johnson
 Chester Morris as Danny
 Allen Jenkins as Louis
 Earle Foxe as Scannel
 Claire Dodd as Gladys
 Mae Busch as Mae
 Toshia Mori as Lulu
 Joseph Cawthorn as Manager
 Olin Howland as Eddie
 Sterling Holloway as Red
 Charles Lane as Cashier (uncredited)
 Sam McDaniel as Train Porter

Preservation status
A print is preserved in the Library of Congress-Packard Campus for Audio-Visual Conservation collection.

References

External links

 

1933 films
American black-and-white films
1933 crime drama films
1930s English-language films
Films directed by Ray Enright
Films about organized crime in the United States
Warner Bros. films
American crime drama films
1930s American films